Scarnagh Cross or Scarnagh is a small hamlet in north County Wexford in Ireland. It is four miles from the sea, on the R772 regional road between Gorey and Arklow. The village of Coolgreany is nearby. The townlands of Scarnagh Lower and Scarnagh Upper (Scearnach Uachtarach) lie in the historic barony of Gorey.

See also
 List of towns and villages in Ireland

References

Townlands of County Wexford